Tiveden National Park is a national park situated in the Tiveden forest in the municipalities of Laxå (Örebro County) and Karlsborg (Västra Götaland County), in the historical province of Västergötland in Sweden. It is administered by Naturvårdsverket and the county of Örebro, although a part of its area is located in the county of Västra Götaland. It consists of wild forest over rugged terrain. The national park was established in 1983 and the size was initially . After an extension in 2017, it now covers

History 
At the beginning of the Middle Ages, the forest of Tiveden was a hiding-place for outlaws, who took refuge there.

References 

National parks of Sweden
Protected areas established in 1983
1983 establishments in Sweden
Örebro County
Västra Götaland County